Caty McNally and Diane Parry defeated Wang Xinyu and Wu Fang-hsien in the final, 6–0, 7–5 to win the doubles tennis title at the 2023 Mérida Open.

This was the first edition of the tournament.

Seeds

Draw

Draw

References

External links 
 Main draw

2023 WTA Tour